Sulekha Ali is a Somali-Canadian musician. Based in Ottawa, she attended Carleton University, where she graduated with a Bachelor of Arts (BA Hons) degree in Human Rights. Her choice of tertiary studies has significantly influenced her music, which is noted for its thoughtful, socially conscious lyrics.

Ali's hit singles include "Hooyo" ("Mother" in the Somali language) and "Time and Time".

See also
A'maal Nuux
Sweet Rush (band)

References

External links

Somalian emigrants to Canada
Somalian musicians
Musicians from Ottawa
Carleton University alumni